is a Japanese professional shogi player ranked 9-dan. He is currently an executive director of the Japan Shogi Association.

Early life
Daisuke Suzuki was born in Machida, Tokyo on July 11, 1974. He won the 11th  tournament in 1986, defeating fellow future shogi professional Toshiaki Kubo in the semi-final round.

In June 1986, Suzuki entered the Japan Shogi Association's apprentice school at the rank of 6-kyū as a protegee of shogi professional Nobuyuki Ōuchi. He was promoted to 1-dan in October 1988, and then obtained full professional status and the rank of 4-dan in October 1994.

Shogi professional
Suzuki's first tournament victory as a professional came in 1996 when he defeated Takashi Abe to win the 15th  tournament. In March 1999, he defeated Masataka Gōda to win the 49th NHK Shogi TV Tournament for his only other tournament victory.

In October 1999, Suzuki made his first appearance in a major title match as the challenger to Takeshi Fujii for the 12th Ryūō title, but lost the match 4 games to 1. In 2006, he defeated Yoshiharu Habu to earn the right to challenge defending champion Yasumitsu Satō for the 77th Kisei title, but ended up losing the match 3 games to none.

Playing style and theoretical contributions
Suzuki is considered to be one of the foremost specialists in the Ranging Rook opening. Suzuki and fellow ranging rook specialists Takeshi Fujii and Toshiaki Kubo are collectively referred to as the "Ranging Rook Big Three".

Suzuki has also been recognized for his contributions to opening theory and received the 32nd Kōzō Masuda Award for the 20045 shogi year for his development of the New Quick Ishida attacking formation.

Promotion history
The promotion history for Suzuki is as follows:
 6-kyū: 1986
 4-dan: October 1, 1994
 5-dan: April 1, 1997
 6-dan: October 1, 1999
 7-dan: April 1, 2002
 8-dan: April 1, 2003
 9-dan: March 1, 2017

Titles and other championships
Suzuki has appeared as a challenger in a major title match twice: the 12th Ryūō title (1999) and the 77th Kisei title (2006). He has won two non-major shogi championships during his career: the 15th  (1996) and the 49th NHK Cup (1999).

Awards and honors
Suzuki has received a number of Japan Shogi Association Annual Shogi Awards throughout his career. He won the awards for "Best New Player", "Best Winning Percentage" and "Most Consecutive Games Won" in 1996; the "Fighting Spirit Award" in 1999; and the Kōzō Masuda Award in 2004.

Year-end prize money and game fee ranking
Suzuki has finished in the "Top 10" of the JSA's  twice since 1993: he earned a total of JPY 21,600,000 to rank eighth in 2000, and JPY 22,770,000 to rank eighth in 2006.

JSA director
Suzuki was selected to be an executive director and serve on the Japan Shogi Association's board of directors for a two-year term at the association's 68th General Meeting on May 29, 2017. He was subsequently re-elected to additional two-year terms in June 2019 and June 2021.

References

External links
ShogiHub: Professional Player Info · Suzuki, Daisuke

1974 births
Japanese shogi players
Living people
People from Machida, Tokyo
Professional shogi players
Professional shogi players from Tokyo Metropolis
Recipients of the Kōzō Masuda Award